Texas Isaiah is a first-generation Black Indigenous American photographer and contemporary artist born in Brooklyn, New York. He is currently based in Los Angeles, CA. His family is from Guyana, Venezuela, and Barbados. He is the 2019 recipient of the Getty Images: Where We Stand Creative Bursary grant. In 2017, Texas Isaiah was featured in TIME as one of the top 12 African American photographers you should follow right now. Texas Isaiah is currently a 2020–21 artist in residence at The Studio Museum in Harlem.

Life and work 
Texas Isaiah was born in Brooklyn, New York. As a child, he attended Catholic school. He attended college for a short time and dropped out after discovering that formal education wasn't a proper fitting. He is an autodidact. The intimate works he creates center the possibilities that can emerge by inviting individuals to participate in the photographic process. He is attempting to shift the power dynamics rooted in photography to display different ways of accessing support in one's own body. For non-secular reasons, Texas Isaiah does not disclose his age, and most of the information surrounding this birth year is incorrect. 

In 2020, he was the first trans photographer to photograph a cover for any Vogue magazine edition. A variety of covers were issued for British Vogue's September issue with Texas Isaiah imaging: Jesse Williams, Patrisse Cullors-Brignac, Janaya Khan, and Janet Mock. His work has been published in Harpers Bazaar, TIME, Cultured Magazine, Photographic Journal, Killens Review of Arts & Letters, Paper Safe Magazine, and Spook Mag and also on several catalogue and book covers including the 2017-2018 exhibition catalogue for the Studio Museum in Harlem and Fred Moten's Stolen Life (Consent Not to be a Single Being). He has worked on campaigns with Calvin Klein and Abercrombie and Fitch. He has also has exhibited at numerous centres including Fotografiska in New York City, Aperture Foundation Gallery, Hammer Museum in Los Angeles, the Studio Museum in Harlem, Charlie James Gallery in Los Angeles, and the New Space Center for Photography in Portland.

References 

Living people
American photographers
Year of birth missing (living people)